Ravenska Vas ( or ; , formerly Sveti Urh) is a settlement immediately east and southeast of Zagorje ob Savi in central Slovenia. The area is part of the traditional region of Upper Carniola. It is now included with the rest of the municipality in the Central Sava Statistical Region.

Name
The name of the settlement was changed from Sveti Urh (literally, 'Saint Ulrich') to Ravenska vas (literally, 'level village') in 1955. The name was changed on the basis of the 1948 Law on Names of Settlements and Designations of Squares, Streets, and Buildings as part of efforts by Slovenia's postwar communist government to remove religious elements from toponyms.

Mass graves
Ravenska Vas is the site of five known mass graves associated with the Second World War. They all contain the remains of unidentified victims. The Ravenska Vas 1–3 mass graves are located in a meadow on the edge of the woods.

Church
The local church is dedicated to Saint Ulrich and belongs to the Parish of Zagorje ob Savi. It dates to the late 16th century and was restyled in the Baroque in the late 18th century.

References

External links
Ravenska Vas on Geopedia

Populated places in the Municipality of Zagorje ob Savi